Claire Emslie (born 8 March 1994) is a Scottish footballer who plays as a forward for Angel City FC in the National Women's Soccer League of the United States of America, and the Scotland national team.

She previously played college soccer for the Florida Atlantic Owls and professionally for Hibernian, Bristol City, Manchester City, Orlando Pride, Melbourne City, and Everton. She made her full international debut in 2013 and was selected for the Scotland squad at the 2019 FIFA Women's World Cup. Emslie scored their first goal in the competition, becoming the first woman to score in a World Cup finals for Scotland.

Club career

Hibernian
Emslie began her senior career in 2011 with Scottish Women's Premier League team Hibernian, making her debut in a league game against Falkirk on 24 April. In total, Emslie made thirty-five appearances and scored eighteen times in three seasons with Hibernian, winning the Scottish League Cup in her debut year.

Florida Atlantic Owls
Between 2012 and 2015, Emslie attended Florida Atlantic University, majoring in exercise physiology. During her time in the United States, she played for the Florida Atlantic Owls. She ended her college career with 29 goals and 10 assists in four seasons.

Bristol City
On 16 June 2016, Emslie returned to the UK and joined FA WSL 2 side Bristol City. She went on to score ten goals in twelve matches for Bristol, leading her team to promotion into the FA WSL. She signed a new contract with Bristol in February 2017.

Manchester City
On 1 July 2017, following the end of the shortened FA WSL Spring Series, Emslie joined Manchester City. She scored her first goal for the team in an FA WSL Cup group stage win over Oxford United on 2 November 2017. She won a domestic cup double with City during the 2018–19 season, lifting both the League Cup and FA Cup.

Orlando Pride
On 30 May 2019, Emslie agreed a move to Orlando Pride of the NWSL, officially joining the team upon conclusion of Scotland's run at the 2019 FIFA Women's World Cup which ended on 19 June with a dramatic 3–3 draw against Argentina in the Group Stage. She was the only one of the Prides' nine players at the World Cup to not progress to the knockout round. She made her debut for the team on 20 July 2019, coming on as a substitute for Rachel Hill in a 1–0 win over Sky Blue FC.

In March 2020, the impending NWSL season was postponed due to the coronavirus pandemic. An eventual restart was made through a smaller schedule 2020 NWSL Challenge Cup tournament. However, on 22 June, Orlando withdrew from the tournament following positive COVID-19 tests among both players and staff. Having signed permanently with English FA Women's Super League club Everton in December 2020, Orlando lost Emslie's NWSL playing rights to Angel City FC during the 2022 NWSL Expansion Draft.

Loan to Melbourne City
Emslie was loaned to Australian club Melbourne City in November 2019. Emslie scored four regular season goals as Melbourne successfully defended their Premiership title and subsequently went on to win the Championship, beating Sydney FC in the final.

Everton
In August 2020, having been unable play since the W-League Championship game in February due to the COVID-19 pandemic, Orlando loaned Emslie to FA WSL club Everton ahead of the 2020–21 season. The move was made permanent on 31 December 2020 and Emslie signed an 18-month contract with Everton.

Angel City FC
Angel City FC acquired the rights to sign Claire Emslie in the 2022 NWSL Expansion Draft of December 2021, and then officially signed her on 7 July 2022. On July 9, 2022, she scored the winning goal in her first appearance for Angel City Fc vs San Diego Wave

International career
Emslie has represented Scotland internationally. At youth level, she won caps with the U17s and U19s. She scored goals in consecutive UEFA Women's Under-19 Championship tournaments in 2012 and 2013 respectively.

In June 2013, Emslie made her senior debut against Iceland in an international friendly. After it became clear that she would be based in the United States for a long period, Emslie was not considered for international selection until her studies in Florida concluded and she moved to England. Her second cap came in a friendly against Denmark in January 2017. She was recalled to the national team in August 2017 when new manager Shelley Kerr called her up for a friendly against Hungary. Emslie subsequently scored her first senior international goal against Hungary in a 3–0 win at the Telki Training Centre in Pest County. Kerr selected Emslie for the 2019 FIFA Women's World Cup in France, the first time the nation had ever qualified for the tournament.

Emslie scored Scotland's first-ever World Cup goal on 9 June 2019 in a group stage defeat to England.

Personal life
Emslie was born in Edinburgh to parents Neil and Anna before being raised in Penicuik. She counts former Hibernian teammate Caroline Weir and Bristol teammate Chloe Arthur among her close friends, both of whom also play for Scotland.

Career statistics

Club
.

International
.

International goals
As of 4 March 2020. Scores and results list Scotland's goal tally first.

Honours
Hibernian
Scottish Women's Premier League Cup: 2011

Manchester City
FA Women's League Cup: 2018–19
Women's FA Cup: 2018–19

Melbourne City
W-League Premiership: 2019–20
W-League Championship: 2019–20

References

External links

1994 births
Living people
People from Penicuik
Footballers from Edinburgh
Florida Atlantic University alumni
Scottish women's footballers
Scotland women's international footballers
Women's association football forwards
Scottish expatriate women's footballers
Expatriate women's soccer players in the United States
Scottish expatriate sportspeople in the United States
Scottish Women's Premier League players
Women's Super League players
Hibernian W.F.C. players
Florida Atlantic Owls women's soccer players
Bristol City W.F.C. players
Manchester City W.F.C. players
Orlando Pride players
2019 FIFA Women's World Cup players
National Women's Soccer League players
Expatriate women's soccer players in Australia
Scottish expatriate sportspeople in Australia
Melbourne City FC (A-League Women) players
Sportspeople from Midlothian
Everton F.C. (women) players
Angel City FC players